Lyubov Yarovaya is a 1953 Soviet drama film directed by Yan Frid. It was based on a 1926 play of the same name by Konstantin Trenyov, which was later adapted a second time as a 1970 film. The film was the most popular film released in the Soviet Union that year, with attendance figures of more than 46 million.

Subject 
Russian Civil War

Cast
   Zinaida Karpova  as Lyubov Yarovaya 
 Igor Gorbachyov  as Shvandya  
 Elena Granovskaya as Elena Ivanovna Gornostaeva  
 Valentina Kibardina  as Panova  
 Aleksandr Mazayev as Yarovoy

References

Bibliography 
 Goble, Alan. The Complete Index to Literary Sources in Film. Walter de Gruyter, 1999.
 Rollberg, Peter. Historical Dictionary of Russian and Soviet Cinema. Scarecrow Press, 2008.

External links 
 

1953 films
1953 drama films
Soviet drama films
1950s Russian-language films
Films directed by Yan Frid
Soviet black-and-white films
ru: Любовь Яровая (спектакль, 1951)